Let's Get Down may refer to:
"Let's Get Down" (Tony! Toni! Toné! song)
"Let's Get Down" (Bow Wow song)
"Let's Get Down" (Supafly song)